Nine Sisters was launched in 1785 in Newnham. She spent most of her career as West Indiaman, though she did trade with Petersburg at one point. A French privateer captured her in 1799.

Career
Nine Sisters first appeared in Lloyd's Register in 1787. 

On 24 December 1793 Lloyd's List reported that Nine Sisters, Phillips, master, and Wildman, Concale, master, ran foul of each other in the Downs. Nine Sisters had been sailing for Tobago, and lost her bowsprit head. Wildman, bound for Jamaica, lost her jib boom.

Lloyd's List reported on 11 November 1794 that Nine Sisters, Phillips, master, had sprung a leak as she was leaving London for Jamaica and had to put back to Ramsgate.

Lloyd's List reported on 7 April 1797 that Nine Sisters had had to put back to Jamaica. She had left Jamaica for Dublin.

Fate
In 1799 Lloyd's List reported that the privateer Hussar had captured Nine Sisters, Simpson, master, and carried her into Surinam on 12 June 1799. She had been on a voyage from Dublin to Jamaica. 

Hawksley purchased another vessel, which too was captured, this one in 1801.

Citations

1785 ships
Age of Sail merchant ships of England
Captured ships